Jeffrey Michaud (born September 30, 1993) is an American soccer player who plays for the St. Louis Ambush of the Major Arena Soccer League.

Career

College and Youth
Michaud played four years of college soccer, beginning at the University of Central Florida between in 2011, before transferring to Eastern Florida State College in 2013.

Michaud appeared for Premier Development League side Fort Lauderdale Schulz Academy in 2011.

Tampa Bay Rowdies
Michaud signed for North American Soccer League side Tampa Bay Rowdies on February 24, 2015. Michaud played in four matches in his rookie season, logging 32 minutes of playtime.

In February 2016, Michaud made preseason appearances in games against Major League Soccer's D.C. United, Philadelphia Union, and Montreal Impact. On March 11, 2016, it was announced that he would be joining the USL's Wilmington Hammerheads on a season-long loan.

Forward Madison
After stints with the South Florida Surf in USL League Two and Miami FC in the National Premier Soccer League, Michaud joined USL League One club Forward Madison FC ahead of their inaugural season. He made his league debut for the club on April 6, 2019 in a 1-0 away defeat to Chattanooga Red Wolves. On June 27, 2019 Michaud and Madison mutually terminated his contract.

References

External links 
 
 Rowdies profile

1993 births
Living people
American soccer players
UCF Knights men's soccer players
Floridians FC players
Tampa Bay Rowdies players
Wilmington Hammerheads FC players
Miami FC players
Forward Madison FC players
Orlando SeaWolves players
Association football midfielders
Soccer players from Florida
USL League Two players
North American Soccer League players
USL Championship players
USL League One players
Major Arena Soccer League players
St. Louis Ambush (2013–) players
Baltimore Blast players
United Premier Soccer League players